Protonarthrini is a tribe of longhorn beetles of the subfamily Lamiinae. It was described by Thomson in 1864.

Taxonomy
 Brachynarthron Breuning, 1956
 Falsosophronica Breuning, 1952
 Protonarthron Thomson, 1858
 Karlwernerius Gaudin and Sudre, 2022

References